"Till You're Gone" is a song written by Walt Aldridge and Tom Brasfield, and recorded by American country music artist Barbara Mandrell.  It was released in April 1982 as the first single from the album ...In Black and White.  The song was Mandrell's fifth number one on the country chart.  The single went to number one for one week and spent a total of 14 weeks on the country top 40 chart.

Charts

Weekly charts

Year-end charts

References

1982 singles
1982 songs
Barbara Mandrell songs
Songs written by Walt Aldridge
Songs written by Tom Brasfield
Song recordings produced by Tom Collins (record producer)
MCA Records singles